Poland participated in the Eurovision Song Contest 1999. The Polish broadcaster Telewizja Polska (TVP) selected country's entry via an internal selection. Mietek Szcześniak was ultimately selected to represent Poland at the 1999 contest in Jerusalem, Israel with the song "Przytul mnie mocno" written by Seweryn Krajewski and Wojciech Ziembicki. Szcześniak and his contest entry were announced on 9 March 1999.

Poland competed in the Eurovision Song Contest which took place on 29 May 1999. Performing during the show in position 12, Poland placed eighteenth out of the 23 participating countries, scoring 17 points.

Background 

Prior to the 1999 Contest, Poland had participated in the Eurovision Song Contest five times since its first entry in 1994. Poland's highest placement in the contest, to this point, has been second place, which the nation achieved with its debut entry in 1994 with the song "To nie ja!" performed by Edyta Górniak. The Polish national broadcaster, Telewizja Polska (TVP), broadcasts the event within Poland and organises the selection process for the nation's entry. Having internally selected their entries since 1994, the broadcaster opted to continue selecting the Polish entry via an internal selection for 1999.

Before Eurovision

Internal selection 

The Polish entry for the 1999 Eurovision Song Contest was selected via an internal selection. On 9 March 1999, it was announced that Mietek Szcześniak would represent Poland in the Eurovision Song Contest 1999 with the song "Przytul mnie mocno", written by Seweryn Krajewski and Wojciech Ziembicki. TVP directly invited four artists to perform "Przytul mnie mocno" during a live audition round held in early 1999: Andrzej Piaseczny, Kasia Stankiewicz, Mietek Szcześniak and Natalia Kukulska, during which Szcześniak was selected by a selection committee to represent Poland. Among the members of the selection committee were Marek Sierocki (Head of Entertainment of TVP1), Irena Santor (singer and actress) and Wojciech Gąssowski (singer and composer).

At Eurovision 
According to Eurovision rules, all nations with the exceptions of the bottom seven countries in the 1998 contest competed in the final on 29 May 1999. On 17 November 1998, a special allocation draw was held which determined the running order and Poland was set to perform in position 12, following the entry from Netherlands and before the entry from Iceland. Poland finished in eighteenth place with 17 points.

The show was broadcast in Poland on TVP1 and TVP Polonia with commentary by Artur Orzech. The Polish spokesperson, who announced the Polish votes during the final, was Maciej Orłoś.

Voting 
Below is a breakdown of points awarded to Poland and awarded by Poland in the contest. The nation awarded its 12 points to Germany in the contest.

References

1999
Countries in the Eurovision Song Contest 1999
Eurovision
Eurovision